Denise Sweet is an Anishinaabe poet. From 2004 to 2008, she served as the Wisconsin Poet Laureate.

Background
Sweet grew up in Minnesota and is an enrolled member of the White Earth Band of Minnesota Chippewa Tribe.

Career
Sweet was educated at the University of Wisconsin-Eau Claire and taught creative writing, literature, and mythology at University of Wisconsin-Green Bay. She also taught a travel seminar in the Yucatán Peninsula and Guatemala where she did fieldwork among the Maya peoples.

Awards and honors 
Sweet has won several awards for her poetry including the Diane Decorah Award, the Posner Award, the Woman of the Year Award from the Wisconsin Women's Council, and the Native Writers' Circle of the Americas First Book Award for Poetry. In 2004 she became the Poet Laureate of Wisconsin.

Books by Denise Sweet
Palominos Near Tuba City: New & Selected Poems, Holy Cow! Press, April, 2018
Songs for Discharming, Greenfield Review Press
Days of Obsidian, Days of Grace, Poetry Harbor Press
Know By Heart, Rhiannon Press

Anthologies
Nitaawichige: Selected Poetry and Prose by Four Anishinaabe Writers, Poetry Harbor
Stories Migrating Home: Anishnaabe Prose, Loonfeather Press
Reinventing the Enemy's Language: Contemporary Native Women's Writing of North America, W.W. Norton
Returning the Gift: Poetry and Prose from the First North American Native Writers' Festival, University of Arizona Press
Women Brave in the Face of Danger, Crossing Press

References

External links 
Governor Doyle Appoints Denise Sweet Poet Laureate of Wisconsin
Denise Sweet becomes Wisconsin's poet laureate
Denise Sweet will be a wonderful Poet Laureate from The Middlewesterner
Denise Sweet Wisconsin Poet Laureate
Outstanding Women of Color In Education Awards, Univ. Wisconsin System
Sweet's Faculty page
Poet Denise Sweet Video produced by PBS Wisconsin

American women poets
Ojibwe people
Living people
Native American poets
Poets Laureate of Wisconsin
University of Wisconsin–Eau Claire alumni
University of Wisconsin–Green Bay faculty
Poets from Wisconsin
Year of birth missing (living people)
Native American women writers
American women academics
20th-century Native American women
21st-century Native American women